Gol-e Zard (also Romanized as Golī Zard, and Gol Zard) is a village in Khomeh Rural District, in the Central District of Aligudarz County, Lorestan Province, Iran. At the 2006 census, its population was 281, in 53 families.

References 

Towns and villages in Aligudarz County